Larisa Borisovna Rudakova is a Russian soprano singer.

Early life
Rudakova was born in Yekaterinburg and then somewhere in the 1990s moved to Moscow where he attended and then graduated from the Moscow Conservatory in 1992. There she was under guidance from Irina Maslennikova, and following that was hired by the Bolshoi Theatre where she became a terrific performer because she sang the role of Rosina 11 times in the Gioachino Rossini’s The Barber of Seville.

Career
By 1993 she became the soloist of the theatre. She used to travel for performances as well to such opera houses as Metropolitan, Hamburg and Vienna State Operas. From 1997 to 1998 she sang Mozart's The Magic Flute at the Wallonian Royal Opera and the same year was a participant of the Salzburg Festival where she sang another Mozart's work called Mitridate, re di Ponto under Roger Norrington's conduction. Later on, she became a participant of the All-World Theatre Olympiad where she sang a role of Regan in a contemporary opera based on Toshio Hosokawa's work called Vision of Lear which at that time was Tadashi Suzuki's production.

In 2001 she was awarded with the Order of Friendship and three years later performed at the Belgrade National Opera where she sang the heroine of La traviata. In 2005 she appeared as Gilda in a Rigoletto opera at Sofia's National Opera and Ballet and the same year participated at the Jan Kiepura Festival which was named after famous Polish tenor Jan Kiepura. From 2006 to 2007 she was had appearances at both the Cadogan Carnegie Halls as well as Latvian Dzintari Concert Hall and was a probationist at the Deutsche Grammophon.

Bolshoi Theatre
The Golden Cockerel — The Queen of Shemakha
La traviata — Violetta
The Tsar’s Bride — Marfa 
Ivan Susanin — Antonida
Lucia di Lammermoor — main role
La bohème — Musetta
Un ballo in maschera — Oscar
The Snow Maiden — main role
Iolanta — main role
The Tale of Tsar Saltan — The Swan Princess
The Magic Flute — Queen of the Night
Rigoletto — Gilda
Tancredi — Amenaide
Semiramide — main role
Carmen — Micaela
Betrothal in a Monastery — Louisa
Ruslan and Lyudmila — Lyudmila

References

Living people
Russian operatic sopranos
Moscow Conservatory alumni
21st-century Russian women opera singers
Musicians from Yekaterinburg
1963 births
Honored Artists of the Russian Federation
20th-century Russian women opera singers